Euchalcia is a genus of moths of the family Noctuidae.

Species

 Euchalcia albavitta (Ottolengui, 1902)
 Euchalcia altaica Dufay, 1968
 Euchalcia annemaria de Freina & Hacker, 1985
 Euchalcia armeniae Dufay, 1965
 Euchalcia augusta (Staudinger, 1891)
 Euchalcia aureolineata Gyulai & Ronkay, 1997
 Euchalcia bactrianae Dufay, 1968
 Euchalcia bea Hreblay & Ronkay, 1998
 Euchalcia bellieri (Kirby, 1900)
 Euchalcia biezankoi (Alberti, 1965)
 Euchalcia borealis Lafontain & Poole, 1991
 Euchalcia caeletissima Hreblay & Ronkay, 1998
 Euchalcia cashmirensis Moore, 1881
 Euchalcia chalcophanes Dufay, 1963
 Euchalcia chlorocharis (Dufay, 1961)
 Euchalcia consona (Fabricius, 1787)
 Euchalcia cuprescens Dufay, 1965
 Euchalcia defreinai Hacker, 1986
 Euchalcia dorsiflava (Standfuss, 1892)
 Euchalcia emichi (Rogenhofer, 1873)
 Euchalcia exornata Ronkay, 1987
 Euchalcia gerda (Püngeler, 1907)
 Euchalcia hedeia Dufay, 1978
 Euchalcia herrichi (Staudinger, 1861)
 Euchalcia hissarica Klyucho, 1983
 Euchalcia hyrcaniae Dufay, 1963
 Euchalcia italica (Staudinger, 1882)
 Euchalcia kautti Hacker & Ronkay, 1992
 Euchalcia kitchingi Hacker & Ronkay, 1992
 Euchalcia kondarensis Klyucho, 1989
 Euchalcia maria (Staudinger, 1891)
 Euchalcia modestoides Poole, 1989
 Euchalcia nepalina Hreblay & Plante, 1995
 Euchalcia orophasma (Boursin, 1960)
 Euchalcia paulina (Staudinger, 1891)
 Euchalcia renardi (Eversmann, 1844)
 Euchalcia sergia (Oberthür, 1884)
 Euchalcia serraticornis Dufay, 1965
 Euchalcia siderifera (Eversmann, 1856)
 Euchalcia stilpna Dufay, 1969
 Euchalcia taurica (Osthelder, 1933)
 Euchalcia variabilis – purple-shaded gem (Piller & Mitterpacher, 1783)
 Euchalcia viridis (Staudinger, 1901)
 Euchalcia xanthoides Dufay, 1968

References
 Euchalcia at Markku Savela's Lepidoptera and Some Other Life Forms
 Natural History Museum Lepidoptera genus database
 Biodiversity Heritage Library: Bibliography

Plusiinae